2674 Pandarus  is a large Jupiter trojan from the Trojan camp, approximately  in diameter. It was discovered on 27 January 1982, by astronomers at Harvard's Oak Ridge Observatory near Harvard, Massachusetts, in the United States. The likely elongated D-type asteroid has a rotation period of 8.48 hours and belongs to the 50 largest Jupiter trojans. It was named after Pandarus from Greek mythology.

Orbit and classification 

Pandarus is a dark Jovian asteroid orbiting in the trailing Trojan camp at Jupiter's  Lagrangian point, 60° behind its orbit in a 1:1 resonance (see Trojans in astronomy). It is also a non-family asteroid of the Jovian background population.

It orbits the Sun at a distance of 4.8–5.5 AU once every 11 years and 9 months (4,307 days; semi-major axis of 5.18 AU). Its orbit has an eccentricity of 0.07 and an inclination of 2° with respect to the ecliptic.

Naming 

This minor planet was named after Pandarus from Greek mythology, He was the Lycian warrior whose treacherous wounding of the Greek Spartan leader Menelaus broke the truce in the Trojan War. The verb "to pander" and "pandering" are derived from his name. The official naming citation was published by the Minor Planet Center on 6 June 1982.

Physical characteristics 

Pandarus has been characterized as a D-type asteroid by the survey conducted by Pan-STARRS. It is also a dark D-type in the Tholen classification and in the SDSS-based taxonomy.

Rotation period 

In the 1980s, a rotational lightcurve of Pandarus was obtained from photometric observations by Linda French using the SMARTS 0.9-meter reflector at Cerro Tololo Inter-American Observatory in Chile. Lightcurve analysis gave a well-defined rotation period of 8.480 hours with a brightness variation of 0.58 magnitude, indicative of a non-spheroidal shape.

In 2015 and 2017, Robert Stephens and Daniel Coley at the Center for Solar System Studies in California, measured two concurring periods of 8.461 and 8.470 hours with an amplitude of 0.49 and 0.65 magnitude, respectively.

Diameter and albedo 

According to the surveys carried out by the Infrared Astronomical Satellite IRAS, the Japanese Akari satellite and the NEOWISE mission of NASA's Wide-field Infrared Survey Explorer, Pandarus measures between 74.27 and 101.72 kilometers in diameter and its surface has an albedo between 0.044 and 0.067. The Collaborative Asteroid Lightcurve Link derives an exceptionally low albedo of 0.0244 and a diameter of 97.69 kilometers based on an absolute magnitude of 9.70.

Notes

References

External links 
 Asteroid Lightcurve Database (LCDB), query form (info )
 Dictionary of Minor Planet Names, Google books
 Discovery Circumstances: Numbered Minor Planets (1)-(5000) – Minor Planet Center
 
 

002674
002674
Named minor planets
002674
19820127